The Cystostereaceae are a family of fungi in the order Polyporales. The family was circumscribed by Swiss mycologist Walter Jülich in 1982. , Index Fungorum accepts 6 genera and 18 species in the family.

References

 
Cystostereaceae
Fungi described in 1982
Taxa named by Walter Jülich